Terushi Furuhashi (born 6 February 1952) is a Japanese archer. He competed in the men's individual and team events at the 1988 Summer Olympics.

References

1952 births
Living people
Japanese male archers
Olympic archers of Japan
Archers at the 1988 Summer Olympics
Place of birth missing (living people)